Ögmundur Jónasson (born 17 July 1948) is an Icelandic politician who has served as a member of Althingi, the Icelandic Parliament, since 1995. He is currently the Chairman of the Parliament’s Constitutional and Supervisory Committee and is a representative to the Parliamentary Assembly of the Council of Europe. He is the former Minister of the Interior (2011-2013); Minister of Justice and Human Rights and Minister of Transport, Communications and Local Government (2010-2011); and Minister of Health and Social Security (2009).

Apart from his political career, Ögmundur has been a journalist and a trade union leader. He has been active in various grass-root activities, a prolific commentator and public speaker. He graduated from the University of Edinburgh with degrees in History and Political Science and was for a number of years a part-time Lecturer at the University of Iceland. When he entered Parliament, he first represented the People's Alliance and Non-Aligned and later the Left-Green Movement. He was a radio broadcaster and TV reporter at RÚV, the Icelandic Public Broadcasting Service (1978-1988) and the Chairman of BSRB, the Confederation of State and Municipal Employees of Iceland (1988-2009). He has served on several international trade union boards, such as the European Trade Union Confederation (ETUC), the European Federation of Public Service Unions (EPSU), Public Services International (PSI), the Council of Nordic Trade Unions (NFS) and the Council of Nordic Municipal Employees (NTR).

Ögmundur became Iceland's Minister of Health in February 2009, but resigned at the end of September in connection with the Icesave dispute. He returned to the government in September 2010 and from January 2011 he headed the newly created Ministry of the Interior and stayed as minister until a new government came to power in 2013.

Ögmundur has been outspoken on foreign policy issues. He is critical of Iceland's NATO membership and a strong supporter of human rights and national minority rights. He is also a supporter of the Campaign for the Establishment of a United Nations Parliamentary Assembly, an organisation which campaigns for democratic reformation of the United Nations. He has gained international attention in connection with three issues. First, he proposed measures designed to protect children from the harms of violent pornography as part of his broader support for human rights and women’s rights. It was a step criticized by some free speech activists, but welcomed by human rights advocates and feminists. Second, his decision in 2011 to reject a plan by a Chinese business tycoon, Mr. Huang Nubo, to purchase a huge tract of land in the North East of Iceland attracted much geopolitical and media attention. It raised suspicions that the plan was part of Chinese efforts to gain a strategic foothold in Iceland. Third, Ögmundur Jónasson refused all cooperation with FBI agents who had come to Iceland in 2011 to question Sigurdur Thordarson—on the pretext of investigating an impending hacking attack on Icelandic government computers—and directed them to leave the country because he believed that they were, in fact, engaged in a broader swoop to gather intelligence on WikiLeaks and in trying to frame its founder Julian Assange.

References

Ogmundur Jonasson
Ogmundur Jonasson
1948 births
Living people
Ogmundur Jonasson
Ogmundur Jonasson
Alumni of the University of Edinburgh